Code Wilo is a 2019 Nigerian movie about the political happenings of the 2019 Nigerian gubernatorial elections. It projects the need to give space to women and youths in the country's election. Code Wilo was produced by Hauwa Allahbura and directed by Mike-Steve Adeleye; it stars Zack Orji, Eucharia Anunobi, Yaw Comedian, Uzo Arukwe and  Gabriel Afolayan

Synopsis 
The movies revolves around a young lady, Nimi, who is an aspirant for gubernatorial election. She was kidnapped and interactions with her kidnappers reveal it is not just only for ransom. The film also discusses the issue of "godfatherism" in Nigerian politics with Nimi's, father sole decision to make her a governorship candidate

Premiere 
The movie was first premiered in collaboration with Heritage Bank on the 7 of March 2019 at Terra Kulture, Victoria Island, Lagos.

Cast 
Gabriel Afolayan, Eucharia Abinibi Ekwu, Bikiya Graham Douglas, Kali Ikeagwu Alex Usifo Omiagbo, Steve Onu, Zack Orji and Gbenga Titiloye

References 

Nigerian action thriller films
Nigerian action drama films